Bell Center may refer to:

Arenas 
 Bell Centre, a sports venue in Montreal, Quebec, Canada
 Bell MTS Place, an arena in Winnipeg, Manitoba, Canada

Places 
 Bell Center, Wisconsin, a village
 Bell Center, Indiana, an unincorporated community

See also 
 Belle Center, Ohio, a village